Tommy Wayne "Trey" Amburgey III (born October 24, 1994) is an American professional baseball outfielder for the Yokohama DeNA BayStars of Nippon Professional Baseball (NPB). He has played in Major League Baseball (MLB) for the New York Yankees.

Early life and amateur career
Amburgey was born and grew up in Lake Worth, Florida and attended Park Vista Community High School. Amburgey was lightly recruited coming out of high school and played at St. Petersburg College. He had committed to continue his college baseball career at High Point University prior to being drafted.

Professional career

New York Yankees
The New York Yankees selected Amburgey in the 13th round, 393rd overall, of the 2015 Major League Baseball draft. After signing with the team he was initially assigned to the Gulf Coast League Yankees, where he batted .333 with 14 stolen bases in 37 games before being promoted to the Low-A Staten Island Yankees. Amburgey split the 2016 season between the GCL Yankees, the Single-A Charleston RiverDogs, and the High-A Tampa Yankees, accumulating a .274/.313/.381 slash line in 68 games between the three teams. In 2017, Amburgey returned to Tampa and hit .236/.296/.382 with career-highs in home runs (14) and runs batted in (RBIs) (57).

Amburgey spent the 2018 season with the Double-A Trenton Thunder, batting .258/.300/.418 with 16 home runs and 74 RBIs in 125 games. He was assigned to the Triple-A Scranton/Wilkes-Barre RailRiders in 2019 and finished the season with a .274 batting average with 22 home runs, 31 doubles and an .822 OPS. Amburgey did not play in a game in 2020 due to the cancellation of the minor league season because of the COVID-19 pandemic.

He was assigned to Triple-A Scranton/Wilkes-Barre RailRiders to begin the 2021 season. On July 15, 2021, Amburgey's contract was selected to the Yankees' 40-man roster and he was promoted to the major leagues for the first time. He made his MLB debut the following day as the starting right fielder against the Boston Red Sox, going 0-for-2. On August 18, Amburgey was returned to the minors.

Cincinnati Reds
On December 1, 2021, Amburgey signed a minor league contract with the Cincinnati Reds.

Seattle Mariners
On June 25, 2022, Amburgey was traded to the Seattle Mariners. He was released on August 11, 2022.

Yokohama DeNA BayStars
On December 22, 2022, Amburgey signed with the Yokohama DeNA BayStars of Nippon Professional Baseball.

References

External links

1994 births
Living people
People from Lake Worth Beach, Florida
Baseball players from Florida
Major League Baseball outfielders
New York Yankees players
St. Petersburg Titans baseball players
Gulf Coast Yankees players
Staten Island Yankees players
Tampa Yankees players
Charleston RiverDogs players
Trenton Thunder players
Scranton/Wilkes-Barre RailRiders players
Louisville Bats players
Tacoma Rainiers players